UploadFTP was an FTP/SFTP/FTPS/FTPES/FXP client for Windows, developed by Brightek Software. The product has been discontinued, and the company website is no longer online. UploadFTP was shareware and a freeware version UploadFTP Free was also available with some restrictions.

Features
 Support FXP Allows a user to transfer files directly from server to server using drag&drop
 Data in the Cloud User settings such as data of added servers, trusted certificates and so on are stored on-line and can be access from everywhere
 Synchronize & Schedule User can create a sync session to make his file up-to-date or a task for scheduler to perform routine work
 Edit on-the-go No more need to download file first and upload them after editing, with this feature user can edit file with two clicks
 Built-in search engine Search files through over a 4000 FTP servers with 850 TB total content

See also
 File Transfer Protocol
 Comparison of FTP client software

References

FTP clients
SSH File Transfer Protocol clients